is a passenger railway station in the city of Narita, Chiba Japan, operated by the East Japan Railway Company (JR East).

Lines
Namegawa Station is served by the Narita Line, and is located 25.5 kilometers from the terminus of line at Sakura Station.

Station layout
The station consists of dual opposed side platforms connected to the station building by a footbridge; however, platform 1 is used only during peak hours. The station is staffed.

Platforms

History
Namegawa Station was opened on December 29, 1897 as a terminal station on the Narita Railway for both passenger and freight operations. A new station building was completed in 1920, just before the Narita Railway was nationalised on September 1, 1920, becoming part of the Japanese Government Railway (JGR). After World War II, the JGR became the Japan National Railways (JNR). Scheduled freight operations were suspended from April 1, 1971. The station was absorbed into the JR East network upon the privatization of the Japan National Railways (JNR) on April 1, 1987. The station building was rebuilt in 2005.

Passenger statistics
In fiscal 2019, the station was used by an average of 238 passengers daily (boarding passengers only).

Surrounding area
 Tone River
 former Shimofusa town hall
 Shimofusa Post Office

See also
 List of railway stations in Japan

References

External links

JR East station information 

Railway stations in Chiba Prefecture
Railway stations in Japan opened in 1897
Railway stations in Narita, Chiba